Ralph Robert Beistline (born December 6, 1948) is a senior United States district judge of the United States District Court for the District of Alaska.

Education and career

Born in Fairbanks, Alaska, Beistline received a Bachelor of Arts degree from the University of Alaska Fairbanks in 1972 and a Juris Doctor from the University of Puget Sound School of Law (now Seattle University School of Law) in 1974. He was a law clerk to three judges on the Superior Court in Fairbanks from 1974 to 1975, and was thereafter in private practice in Alaska from 1975 to 1992, when he was appointed a judge on the Alaska Superior Court.

District court service

Beistline was nominated by President George W. Bush on November 8, 2001, to a seat on the United States District Court for the District of Alaska vacated by H. Russel Holland. He was confirmed by the United States Senate on March 12, 2002, and received his commission on March 19, 2002. He assumed senior status on December 31, 2015.

References

Sources

1948 births
Living people
Alaska state court judges
Judges of the United States District Court for the District of Alaska
Lawyers from Fairbanks, Alaska
Seattle University School of Law alumni
Superior court judges in the United States
United States district court judges appointed by George W. Bush
21st-century American judges
University of Alaska alumni